was an aircraft and airbase garrison unit of the Imperial Japanese Navy Air Service during the Second Sino-Japanese War and Pacific campaign of World War II.

History
The Genzan Air Group was founded on 15 November 1940 at Genzan, Korea, then a part of the Empire of Japan. It was initially a mixed-unit equipped with 33 Type 96 Mitsubishi G3M1 bombers and 25 Type 96 Mitsubishi A5M4 fighters under the command of the Second Air Fleet. On January 15, 1941, it was reassigned to the 22nd Kōkū Sentai and deployed to Hankou in central China.

Operations in China
While based at Hankou, the bombers of the Genzan Air Group was primarily assigned to strategic bombing missions in Sichuan Province, while the fighters were assigned to combat air patrol and ground support missions in support of Imperial Japanese Army operations. The Genzan Air Group was withdrawn from China in September, 1941, returning to its home base at Genzan for training, and at the end of October, 1941 was forward deployed to Takao in Taiwan.

Operations in Southeast Asia
With the bombing of Pearl Harbor and the outbreak of the Pacific War, the Genzan Air Group was deployed to Saigon, French Indochina.

On January 22, 1942, bombers from the Genzan Air Group attacked Kallang Airport in Singapore, and subsequently provided air support for Japanese offensives in Malaya including the landings at Endau.
At the end of February, the unit was transferred to Bangkok and assigned to patrols over the Indian Ocean; however, facilities at Bangkok were not satisfactory and the unit was soon reassigned to Palembang in Sumatra in the Netherlands East Indies, with some aircraft dispersed to Kuching in Sarawak.

On May 1, 1942, Genzan's flying unit was redeployed to Rabaul, New Britain to support the Japanese campaign in New Guinea. The group participated in the Battle of the Coral Sea, without success, and made numerous bombing attacks against Port Moresby.

In July, after the cancellation of Operation Mo,  the unit was withdrawn to Japan and was based at Misawa, Aomori for training. Its fighter unit was detached and redesignated as the 252 Kōkūtai in September. The Genzan's flying unit was disbanded by being redesignated as the 755 Kōkūtai on 1 November 1942.

Personnel Assigned

Commanding Officers
Capt. Izawa Ishinosuke (43) - 15 November 1940 - 1 October 1941
Cdr. / Capt. Maeda Takanari (47) – 1 October 1941 – 20 September 1942 (Promoted Captain on 15 October 1941.)
Cdr. Yamashita Sakae (49) – 20 September 1942 – 1 November 1942

Executive Officers
Cdr. Minematsu Iwao (48) – 15 November 1940 – 10 October 1941
VACANT – 10 October 1941 – 1 November 1942

Maintenance Officers
LtCdr. (Eng.) Hata Nobukuma (Eng. 31) – 15 November 1940 – 1 September 1941
LtCdr. (Eng.) Azuma Tetsuo (Eng. 33) – 1 September 1941 – 25 September 1942
Lt. (Eng.) Kataoka Shoichi (Eng. 42) – 25 September 1942 – 1 November 1942

Surgeons
LtCdr. (Med.) Masuoka Satoru (1927) - 15 November 1940 – 10 April 1942
LtCdr. (Med.) Takeyasu Sueharu (1930) – 10 April 1942 – 13 October 1942
LtCdr. (Med.) Suzuki Keiichiro (1928) – 13 October 1942 – 1 November 1942

Paymasters
LtCdr. (Pay.) Kishida Mizunari (Pay. 16) – 15 November 1940 – 20 September 1941
Lt. (Pay.) Sudo Hiroshi (Pay. 24) – 20 September 1941 – 5 August 1942
Lt. (Pay.) Nagai Hora (Pay. Aux. 2) – 5 August 1942 – 1 November 1942

Communications Officers
LtCdr. Ikeda Iwao (55) – 15 November 1940 – 15 September 1941
LtCdr. Minekawa Minoru (57) – 15 September 1941 – 1 November 1942

Air Officers
Cdr. Asada Masahiko (52) – 15 November 1940 – 1 September 1941
LtCdr. Sonokawa Kameo (52) – 1 September 1941 – 1 April 1942
LtCdr. Tokoro Shigehachiro (51) – 1 April 1942 – 1 November 1942

References
 Bullard, Steven (translator). Army Operations in the South Pacific Area, New Britain and Papua campaigns, 1942–43 Senshi Sōshō (translated excerpts). Canberra: Australian War Memorial, 2007. .

 Hata, Ikuhiko with Yasuho Izawa and Don Cyril Gorham (translator). Japanese Naval Aces and Fighter Units in World War II. Annapolis, MD: Naval Institute Press, 1975 (Japanese original) 1989 (translation). .
 Peattie, Mark R. Sunburst: The Rise of Japanese Naval Air Power, 1909-1941. Annapolis, MD: Naval Institute Press, 1999. .
 Tagaya, Osamu. Mitsubishi Type 1 "Rikko" 'Betty' Units of World War 2. Botley, Oxfordshire, UK: Osprey Publishing, 2001. .
 Monthly Kōkū-Fan, Illustrated No. 42, Japanese Imperial Army & Navy Aircraft Color, Marking, Tōkyō, Japan, Bunrindō Co. Ltd., 1988.
 Monthly Air World, Photo album of Imperial Japanese Navy Aircraft, Tōkyō, Japan, Air World Inc., 1987.
 Model Art No. 458, Special issue Imperial Japanese Navy Air Force Suicide Attack Unit "Kamikaze", Tōkyō, Japan, Model Art Co. Ltd., 1995.

Groups of the Imperial Japanese Navy Air Service
Wonsan
Military units and formations established in 1940
Military units and formations disestablished in 1942
Military units and formations established in 1944